Simla Special is a 1982 Indian Tamil-language comedy film directed by Muktha Srinivasan, starring Kamal Haasan in the lead role. S. V. Shekher, Sripriya, Thengai Srinivasan, Y. G. Mahendran, Manorama are other major stars appearing in this comedy.

Plot 
Gopu is a budding drama artist. He and his good friend Babu own a popular troupe that performs low-budget comedies. To help Babu pay for his sister's wedding, they accept a commission to perform a set of plays for Tamilians in Simla. One of the plays is titled Simla Special and is written by Mahalakshmi.

While Kamal is in Simla, Babu receives a telegram intended for Gopu informing him of Gopu's mom being seriously ill. Fearing the loss of the money if they renege on the Simla commission, Babu keeps the information from Gopu. Gopu subsequently finds out about his mother's illness when a friend calls to tell him that her situation has worsened. However, for the sake of his friend's sister, he decides to continue acting. He also keeps the information to himself, thinking that if Babu knew, he'd insist that Gopu go back to be by his mother's side.

On the last day of their engagement, Gopu finds the telegram in Babu's coat pocket and realizes his friend's deception. He breaks off his friendship with Babu — but is forced to stay for one last encore before he leaves. While he is performing, Babu receives a call that Gopu's mom has recovered. All is forgiven and the friends reunite.

Cast 

 Kamal Haasan as Gopu
 S. V. Shekher  as Babu
 Sripriya as Mahalakshmi
 Thengai Srinivasan as Mahalakshmi's Father
 Vennira Aadai Moorthy as Sabha Secretary
 Manorama as Roja Devi
 Shanthi Krishna as Uma, Babu's sister
 Y. G. Mahendran as Vasu
 Vanitha as Sri Sri
 Delhi Ganesh as Sundaram
 Kamala Kamesh as Babu's Mother
 Pushpalatha as Gopu's Mother
 Sivachandran as Thief
 V. Gopalakrishnan as Rtd Judge R. Bhaskar's Father
 Kathadi Ramamurthy as Gurbani
 Hanumanthu as Simla Tamil Sangam Wise President
 Typist Gopu as Arthanaari
 Ayya Theriyadhaiah S. Ramarao
 Aisary Velan as Rikshaw Driver
 Gundu Kalyanam
 Usilai Mani as prospective bridegroom's father
 Loose Mohan as prospective bridegroom for Uma
 Oru Viral Krishna Rao
 Ganthimathi
 Vairam Krishnamoorthy
 G. K.
 A. Sahul Hameed
 Ramji
 R. Bhaskar as V. Gopalakrishnan's Son
 S. Rajani
 Jhansi Rani
 R. Mala
 G. Dhanapal

Production 
Kamal Haasan, besides acting as the male lead, also choreographed one song in the film: "Unakenna Mele Ninraai".

Soundtrack 
Soundtrack was composed by M. S. Viswanathan, with lyrics by Vaali. The song "Unakenna Mele" was well received and is set in Sindhu Bairavi raga.

Reception 
Kalki gave the film a mixed review, criticising the story.

References

External links 
 

1980s Tamil-language films
1982 films
Films directed by Muktha Srinivasan
Films scored by M. S. Viswanathan
Films shot in Himachal Pradesh
Films with screenplays by Visu
Indian comedy films